Al-Tadamon Sport Club, is an Iraqi football team based in Al-Najaf, that plays in the Iraq Division Two.

See also 
 1988–89 Iraq FA Cup
 1989–90 Iraq FA Cup

References

External links
 Iraq Clubs- Foundation Dates

1972 establishments in Iraq
Association football clubs established in 1972
Football clubs in Najaf